Emily Howard Stowe (née Jennings, May 1, 1831 – April 30, 1903) was a Canadian physician who was the first female physician to practise in Canada, the second licensed female physician in Canada and an activist for women's rights and suffrage. Stowe helped found the women's suffrage movement in Canada and campaigned for the country's first medical college for women.

Early life
Emily Howard Jennings was born in Norwich Township, Oxford County, Ontario, as one of six daughters of farmers Hannah Howard and Solomon Jennings. While Solomon converted to Methodism, Hannah (who had been educated at a Quaker seminary in the United States) raised her daughters as Quakers in a community that encouraged women to participate and receive an education. She home-schooled Stowe and her five sisters and taught them skills in herbal healing. After teaching at local schools for seven years, her public struggle to achieve equality for women began in 1852, when she applied for admission to Victoria College, Cobourg, Ontario. Refused on the grounds that she was female, she applied to the Normal School for Upper Canada, which Egerton Ryerson had recently founded in Toronto. She entered in November 1853 and was graduated with first-class honours in 1854.  Hired as principal of a Brantford, Ontario public school, she was the first woman to be a principal of a public school in Upper Canada. She taught there until her marriage in 1856 (see Marriage bar).

She married John Fiuscia Michael Heward Stowe in 1856. In the next seven years she had three children: two sons and a daughter. Shortly after the birth of their third child, her husband developed tuberculosis, which led her to take a renewed interest in medicine. Having had experience with herbal remedies and homeopathic medicine since the 1840s, Emily Stowe left teaching and decided to become a doctor.

Medical career
Stowe was denied entrance into the Toronto School of Medicine in 1865 and was told by its Vice Principal, "The doors of the University are not open to women and I trust they never will be." Unable to study medicine in Canada, Emily Stowe earned her degree in the United States from the homeopathic New York Medical College for Women in 1867. The same year, she returned to Canada and opened a medical practice in Toronto, on Richmond Street, that specialized in treating women and children. Stowe gained some local prominence through public lectures on women's health and maintained a steady clientele through newspaper advertisements. 

In the mid-1860s, Canada's medical licensing system began requiring homeopathic doctors and doctors trained in the United States to obtain licenses by taking more courses and an examination. In 1869, Stowe's application to the University of Toronto for chemistry and physiology courses was denied. In 1870, the president of the Toronto School of Medicine, Dr. William Thomas Aikins, granted special permission to Stowe and fellow student Jennie Kidd Trout to attend classes, a requirement for medical practitioners with foreign licences. Faced with hostility from both the male faculty and students, Stowe refused to take the oral and written exams and left the school.

In 1879, a patient of Stowe's, a nineteen-year old Sarah Lovell, died, and Stowe was charged with providing an abortion to her patient. Stowe testified that she had prescribed Lovell a one thirtieth of the full dose of drug that could cause a miscarriage, an amount too small to cause a miscarriage. Many members and male leaders of the Toronto medical community came to her defense. Though the coroner’s jury ruled that Lovell had poisoned herself, Stowe was charged with the performing a medical abortion. Stowe was acquitted after a short trial during which she gained public support.

The College of Physicians and Surgeons of Ontario granted Stowe a licence to practise medicine on July 16, 1880, based on her experience since 1850, Dr. Aikins' willingness to testify for her, and her earlier apprenticeship to Dr. Joseph J. Lancaster. This licence made Stowe the second female licensed physician in Canada, after Trout.

On June 13, 1883, Dr. Emily Stowe, a suffragist and first woman physician to practice medicine in Canada, led a group of supporters to a meeting at the Toronto Women’s Suffrage Club where the group tabled a resolution stating “that medical education for women is a recognized necessity, and consequently facilities for such instruction should be provided.” 

Her daughter, Augusta Stowe-Gullen, was the first woman to earn a medical degree in Canada.

Women's rights

While studying medicine in New York, Stowe met with Susan B. Anthony and witnessed the divisions within the American women's suffrage movement. Stowe also attended a women's club meeting in Cleveland, Ohio. Stowe adopted a gradualist strategy which she brought back to her work in Canada.

In 1876, Stowe founded the Toronto Women's Literary Club, renamed the Canadian Women's Suffrage Association in 1883. This has led some to consider Stowe the mother of the suffrage movement in Canada. The Literary Club campaigned for improved working conditions for women and pressured schools in Toronto to accept women into higher education. In 1883, a public meeting of the Suffrage Association led to the formation of the Ontario Medical College for Women, the country's first women's medical school.  When the Dominion Women's Enfranchisement Association was founded in 1889, Stowe became its first president and remained president until her death.

As is true for many suffragists, a tension existed between Stowe's commitment to fellow women and class loyalty. In an episode that may demonstrate the dominance of the latter, Stowe broke the bond of doctor-patient confidentiality by disclosing the abortion request of a patient, Sara Ann Lovell, a domestic servant, to her employer. (See Abortion trial of Emily Stowe.) Stowe, however, sharply criticized the National Policy economic program in 1892. She believed that it would not help working-class Canadians and was instead a corrupt deal on behalf of major businesses.

After breaking her hip at the Columbian Exposition's Women's Congress in 1893, Stowe retired from medicine. In 1896, Emily and her daughter Augusta participated in an all-female "mock parliament," in which the women considered a petition from a male delegation for the right to vote. Stowe, as the Attorney General, used the same arguments that the Canadian Parliament had levelled against female suffragists and denied the petition. Stowe died in 1903, fourteen years before Canadian women were granted the right to vote.

Personal life

While she counted herself a Quaker until 1879, she became a Unitarian in 1879 and attended the First Unitarian Congregation of Toronto.

Legacy
Stowe the first female public-school principal in Ontario, the first female physician to practice medicine in Canada and a lifelong champion of women’s rights who helped to found the Canadian Women’s Suffrage Association.

Public elementary schools in her hometown of Norwich Township (Emily Stowe Public School) as well as Courtice, Ontario are named after her. A women's shelter in Toronto, Canada, is named after her. In 2018, she was inducted into the Canadian Medical Hall of Fame.

See also 

 Jennie Smillie Robertson
 Jessie Gray

References

External links

[https://web.archive.org/web/20060106081030/http://www.fis.utoronto.ca/hilscan/directory/stowee.htm Archive biography]
The Celebrated Abortion Trial of Dr. Emily Stowe, Toronto, 1879, Constance Backhouse, Canadian Bulletin of Medical History'', Volume 8: 1991 / p. 159-87

1831 births
1903 deaths
New York Medical College alumni
Canadian feminists
Canadian Unitarians
Persons of National Historic Significance (Canada)
20th-century Canadian physicians
19th-century Canadian physicians
Canadian women physicians
Canadian abortion providers
20th-century women physicians
19th-century women physicians
20th-century Canadian women scientists